Zombie Massacre is a 1998 video game for the Amiga computer. It is a clone of the first-person shooter Doom.

Production
Zombie Massacre'''s authors were proprietor of Alpha Software, Gareth Murfin, Dave Boaz‚ Dave Newton (coder)‚ Frank Wille with graphics by James Caygill‚ Jason Jordache‚ Liam Weford, Slawomir Stascheck and music by William Morton (musician). The game was one of two games produced by Alpha Software for the Amiga, the other being Gloom 3, at a time when the machine was being squeezed out of the market. The game was developed using the Gloom engine, but is not to be mistaken for Gloom 4''.

References

External links
Hall of Light – The database of Amiga games

1998 video games
Amiga games
Amiga-only games
Video games developed in the United Kingdom
Video games about zombies